NCAA tournament may refer to a number of tournaments organized by the National Collegiate Athletic Association:

Men's sports 
NCAA Division I men's basketball tournament, the most common usage of this term
NCAA Division II men's basketball tournament, established in 1957, immediately after the NCAA subdivided its member schools into the University Division (today's Division I) and College Division
NCAA Division III men's basketball tournament
NCAA Division I Baseball Championship, more often called by the name of its eight-team final round, the College World Series
NCAA Division I Football Championship, an American college football tournament played each year to determine the champion of the NCAA Division I Football Championship Subdivision (FCS)
NCAA Division II Football Championship, began in 1973. Prior to 1973, four regional bowl games were played in order to provide postseason action for what was then called the NCAA College Division and a poll determined the final champion
NCAA Division III Football Championship, began in 1973. Before 1973, most of the schools now in Division III competed in the College Division.
NCAA Men's Ice Hockey Championship, tournament determines the top men's ice hockey team in NCAA Division I and Division III
NCAA Men's Lacrosse Championship, tournament determines the top men's field lacrosse team in the NCAA Division I, Division II, and Division III
NCAA Division I Men's Soccer Championship, the semifinal and final rounds of which are known as the "College Cup"
NCAA Division II Men's Soccer Championship
NCAA Division III Men's Soccer Championship
NCAA Division I Men's Swimming and Diving Championships
NCAA Men's Tennis Championship, held to crown a team, individual, and doubles champion in American college tennis
NCAA Men's National Collegiate Volleyball Championship
NCAA Division III Men's Volleyball Championship, launched in 2012.

Women's sports 
NCAA Division I women's basketball tournament, an annual college basketball tournament for women
NCAA Division II women's basketball tournament
NCAA Division III women's basketball tournament
NCAA Women's Ice Hockey Tournament
NCAA Women's Lacrosse Championship, tournament determines the top women's lacrosse team in the NCAA Division I, Division II, and Division III
NCAA Women's Soccer Championship, divided into three divisions
NCAA Division I softball tournament, more often called by the name of its eight-team final round, the Women's College World Series
NCAA Division I Women's Swimming and Diving Championships
NCAA Women's Tennis Championship, the National Collegiate Athletic Association's tennis tournament to determine the Team Championships, Singles Championships, and Doubles Championships in Women's Tennis
NCAA Women's Volleyball Championship

See also 
NCAA basketball tournament (disambiguation)
NCAA (Philippines) Championships